Conversations II is an album by American jazz saxophonist Roscoe Mitchell, with pianist Craig Taborn and drummer Kikanju Baku which was recorded in 2013 and released on Wide Hive.

Reception

In his review for Sydney Morning Herald, John Shand states, "Here the anguished energy of the '60s continues to burn (as it does in St Louis) in a series improvisations so dense that it is like peering through the layers of paint on a Jackson Pollock painting. Its very relentlessness is thrilling, independently of the high levels of invention, but it is assuredly not for the faint-hearted"

Regarding Conversations I and II, DownBeat's Bill Meyer commented: "Both of these CDs are remarkably consistent; the engagement and invention never flags, which makes it hard to favor one over the other... Not only is the sound crisp and immaculate, it imparts a spacial experience that makes it feel like the music is happening all around the listener."

Track listing
All compositions by Roscoe Mitchell, Craig Taborn and Kikanju Baku except were noted
 "Frenzy House" – 6:03
 "Chipper and Bing" – 10:26
 "Stay Hayfer" – 5:32
 "They Rode for Them" (Mitchell, Baku) – 3:45
 "I'll See You Out There" – 5:20
 "Wha-Wha" (Mitchell, Taborn) – 2:26
 "Bells in the Wind" – 7:58
 "Shards and Lemons" (Mitchell, Taborn) – 3:41
 "Just Talking" – 5:12
 "Next Step" – 3:32
 "Fly Over and Stay a While" – 9:42

Personnel
Roscoe Mitchell - flute, saxophone
Craig Taborn – piano, organ, synthesizer
Kikanju Baku – drums, percussion

References

2014 albums
Roscoe Mitchell albums
Wide Hive Records albums